Nowkan or Naukan or Nukan or Nookan may refer to:
 Nowkan, Bushehr
 Nowkan, Kerman
 Nukan, Kermanshah
 Nowkan, West Azerbaijan